Rudolf Fredrik Olsen (29 September 1882 – 26 January 1951) was a Norwegian  shipping magnate and Chairman of Fred. Olsen & Co.

Biography

Rudolf Fredrik Olsen  was  born in Hvitsten, in Akershus county, Norway. He was the son of Thomas Frederick (Fred.) Olsen (1857-1933).  Olsen was educated in Britain, France and Belgium.

Olsen worked in the family firm, Fred. Olsen & Co. dating from 1914. Together with his brother Thomas Fredrik Olsen, he was a partner from 1922. After their father's death in 1933, the brothers took over as leaders of the company.  From 1933 he was CEO of the firm.  During his leadership, the company expanded, entering the aviation business with its own airline Fred. Olsen Flyselskap. In addition it obtained partial ownership interests in Scandinavian Airlines System, Widerøe's Flyveselskap AS and Sterling Airlines A/S. 

Olsen  held a board position in a range of companies, including Det Norske Luftfartselskap. From 1917, Olsen was  Consul General to Norway from Italy. In 1938, Olsen was appointed a Knight of the 1st Class of the Order of St. Olav. He was also appointed commander of the Order of the Crown of Italy and the Order of the Crown (Belgium), was an officer of the Order of Saints Maurice and Lazarus and knight of the Order of the White Rose of Finland.

References

Other sources
Nygaard, K. M. (1999) Fra seilskip av tre til dampskip i linjefart. Fred. Olsens rederivirksomhet 1886–1904 (University of Oslo)

1882 births
1951 deaths
People from Vestby
Norwegian businesspeople in shipping
Norwegian Air Lines people
Officers of the Order of Saints Maurice and Lazarus
Commanders of the Order of the Crown (Belgium)